Akcja Fruhwirth (eng. Operation Fruhwirth) - assassination attempt carried out on October 25, 1943 at SS-Scharführer Engelberth Frühwirth, which was part of an extensive campaign to eliminate representatives of the Nazi German terror apparatus in occupied Poland called Operation Heads.

History
The planned action to kill Frühwirth failed. The assassins mistook the aim and they shot the SS-Scharführer Stephan Klein, who was the official of the IVth Office of the Commander of the Security Police and Security Service of the Warsaw District in General Government. Klein was also sentenced to death by the Polish Underground State and his name was also on the list of people to be killed in "action Heads".

References

Bibliography

 

1943 in Poland
History of Warsaw
Fruhwirth